The 2013 Yearly Yuan-jiang Gujinggong Liquor Haikou World Open was a professional ranking snooker tournament that took place between 25 February–3 March 2013 at the Hainan International Exhibition Center in Haikou, China. It was the eighth ranking event of the 2012/2013 season.

Mark Allen defended the title he won in 2012, by defeating Matthew Stevens 10–4 in the final. This was Allen's second ranking title.

Prize fund
The breakdown of prize money for this year is shown below: 

Winner: £85,000
Runner-up: £35,000
Semi-final: £20,000
Quarter-final: £11,000
Last 16: £7,500
Last 32: £6,000
Last 48: £2,300
Last 64: £1,500

Non-televised highest break: £700
Televised highest break: £3,500
Total: £425,000

Wildcard round
These matches were played in Haikou on 25 and 26 February 2013.

Main draw

Final

Qualifying
These matches were held between 18 and 21 December 2012 at the World Snooker Academy in Sheffield, England.

Century breaks

Qualifying stage centuries

 134, 103  Andrew Higginson
 134  Sean O'Sullivan
 133, 116  Thepchaiya Un-Nooh
 131  Zhang Anda
 123  Scott Donaldson
 122  Xiao Guodong
 122  Marco Fu
 121, 100  Kurt Maflin

 120  Thanawat Thirapongpaiboon
 118, 101  Michael White
 115  Li Yan
 111  Jamie Cope
 110  Alan McManus
 101  Robert Milkins
 100  Chen Zhe

Televised stage centuries

 141, 113, 105  John Higgins
 139  Graeme Dott
 127  Ding Junhui
 126  Stuart Bingham
 125, 104  Ricky Walden
 119, 100  Mark Allen

 118, 110  Shaun Murphy
 112, 100  Matthew Stevens
 112  Barry Hawkins
 111, 104, 102  Judd Trump
 107, 107  Neil Robertson
 100  Mark Davis

References

External links
Haikou World Open 2013 – Pictures by World Snooker at Facebook

2013
World Open
World Open (snooker)
Snooker competitions in China
Haikou